Hasanabad (also Romanized as Ḩasanābād; also known as Hasan Abad Rastaq) is a village in Rostaq Rural District, in the Central District of Saduq County, Yazd Province, Iran. At the 2006 census, its population was 477, in 127 families.

References 

Populated places in Saduq County